Liquor & Gaming NSW is an agency of the Government of New South Wales, that is part of the Customer Service cluster. Liquor and Gaming NSW is responsible for the development, implementation and integrity of the regulatory framework for liquor sales, licensed clubs, gaming activities and casino regulation in the state of New South Wales, Australia.

The agency reports to the Minister for Customer Service and Digital Government, Victor Dominello.

Liquor and Gaming NSW also provides Secretariat services to the Independent Liquor and Gaming Authority, which determines licence applications and makes associated decisions, and exercises some decision-making delegations granted by the Authority.

References

External links 
 

Liquor and Gaming NSW
Alcohol in Australia
Gambling in Australia